Casasia clusiifolia, also called the sevenyear apple, is a species of plant belonging to the family Rubiaceae. It is common in Florida.

References

clusiifolia